Porteus (formerly Slax Remix) is a portable operating system based on Slackware. It does not require installation and can be run from fixed and removable media, such as a USB flash drive or compact disc.

Porteus is available in 32-bit and 64-bit version.

Development
The Porteus project started out as "Slax Remix" at the beginning of 2010 and was started as a community project using the Zen kernel to improve and update the Slax OS.

The community agreed on the new name of the project, Porteus, which was named after "'Portability' and 'Proteus'. 'Proteus' is a "Greek god of the sea, capable of changing his form at will," according to the naming announcement on the Porteus forum. The project leader commented on the name, "I find this name as a kind of synonym of 'flexibility.' We have portable (small) and flexible (modular) features included in one name: Porteus."

Porteus 4.0 is available in seven desktop variants: Cinnamon, KDE Plasma 5, LXDE, LXQt, MATE, Openbox and Xfce.

Features
Porteus is based on a substantially modified and optimized version of the Linux Live Scripts. It can be run from a disk or USB stick (with changes saved onto the portable device) or installed on a hard drive. Porteus can even be installed within another system without the need to create a new partition.

Porteus is preloaded with a variety of software that the user selects before installing. The system is downloaded only after selecting various options from a menu including one of four windows management systems, a browser and other features. Porteus uses a package manager utilizing slackware.

Porteus Kiosk

Porteus Kiosk is a specialized edition of the Porteus operating system, a minimalist Linux distribution for web-only terminals with Firefox (or Google Chrome, Chromium or Opera, set upon installation) as the sole application. Porteus Kiosk provides users with a locked down computing environment, designed to be deployed in schools, offices, public libraries, internet cafés or any other business establishment that provides Internet access to their clients.

Porteus Kiosk can be installed to CD/DVD, USB flash drive, hard drive, or any other bootable storage media such as Compact Flash or SD/MMC memory cards. Prior to installation the system can be customized through the kiosk wizard utility which allows system and browser related tweaks.

The Porteus Kiosk system is open source and available free-of-charge, although a number of commercial services such as custom builds, automatic updates and software upgrades are available.
Until version 3.7.0 Porteus Kiosk was able to run on both 32-bit (i486 or greater) and 64-bit (x86_64) machines. As Google Chrome doesn't support 32-bit machines anymore, the developers of the distribution decided to follow that path. Hence with release 4.0.0 Porteus Kiosk supports only the x86_64 architecture. The system is lightweight in terms of size and resources used. The default image is about 80 MB while the size of the custom kiosk ISO will depend on the choice of added extra components such as Adobe Flash, Java, additional fonts and other factors.

Reception
In reviewing Porteus 1.0 in June 2011, Joe "Zonker" Brockmeier wrote, "Users who've missed KDE 3.5.x are in for a treat with Porteus, a portable Linux distribution that offers a 32-bit release with the Trinity fork of KDE 3.5.x, and a 64-bit release that offers KDE 4.6.4. While not a distribution that will appeal to everyone, it might be of interest to enthusiasts of live CD distributions and old-school KDE fans." He concluded "...Porteus looks like a nice portable Linux distribution, aimed at expert or at least experienced Linux users. It's not something that will appeal to the majority of Linux users, particularly users who prefer a slightly larger depth of available packages. But, for users who are nursing older hardware or prefer a portable distribution, Porteus is an interesting project."

About the custom Live CD ISO creation, Linux magazine wrote in Issue 160/2014: "Build Your Own Portable Linux Distro with Porteus Building a customized Linux distribution can be a daunting proposition – unless you use Porteus Wizard. This clever and simple service lets you create a custom Live CD distro that fits a USB stick and loads in RAM."

See also 
 Lightweight Linux distribution
 List of Linux distributions that run from RAM
 List of live CDs
 Kiosk software

References

External links 

 
 
 
Reviews:
 DistroWatch Weekly, Issue 519, 5 August 2013
 DistroWatch Weekly, Issue 575, 8 September 2014
 A Not For The Everyday Linux User Review Of Porteus 3.1, Everyday Linux User
 With Porteus in Your Pocket, You're Good to Go | Reviews | LinuxInsider
 Best Linux Distro: Linux for old laptops, privacy and USB sticks | Trusted Reviews
 Review: Porteus 1.0 | Tux Machines
 Slackware-Based Porteus Linux 4.0 Officially Released with Seven Desktop Flavors, Softpedia News
 Best lightweight Linux distro of 2018 | TechRadar
 Das U-Blog by Prashanth: Review: Porteus 1.0

Light-weight Linux distributions
Linux distributions
Linux distributions without systemd
Live USB
Slackware